Seethi Sahib Higher Secondary School is a prominent higher secondary school in Kerala located in Taliparamba, Kerala, India. It was established in 1968. The school is named after former Speaker Seethi Sahib of the Kerala Legislative Assembly. School is noted for the large number of students attending SSLC public exams each year and their good results. According to school website, around 3500 students currently attends Seethi Sahib H S S. Both high school and higher secondary follows state syllabus. Medium of instruction for higher secondary is English like all higher secondary schools in the state and for high school Malayalam and English are available as options.

Higher Secondary Division

Like most of the higher secondary schools in the state, admission is through the single window online portal run by the directorate of higher secondary education. Courses offered for HSE are Science and Humanities. Good lab facilities, infrastructure and teaching are main attractive factors for the higher secondary applications. Higher secondary block can be accessed through a separate gate available in the Taliparamba - Iritty road.

Clubs and co-curricular activities
School has won Sub-District level Youth Festival competition for five consecutive years. In Science fair the School is best performer in the Subdistrict. Students of Seethi Sahib HSS is presenting their projects in NCSC every year. In Maths fair the school has a distinguished  position in district and State level. In Social Science fair, Work experience and IT fair the school students are showing impressive performance. 
School has active units of
 The Bharat Scouts and Guides
 SPC [Student Police Cadet Project]
 National Service Scheme
JRC [Junior Red Cross]

References

High schools and secondary schools in Kerala
Schools in Kannur district
Taliparamba
Educational institutions established in 1968
1968 establishments in Kerala